LOL, or lol, is an initialism for laughing out loud and a popular element of Internet slang. It was first used almost exclusively on Usenet, but has since become widespread in other forms of computer-mediated communication and even face-to-face communication. It is one of many initialisms for expressing bodily reactions, in particular laughter, as text, including initialisms for more emphatic expressions of laughter such as LMAO ("laughing my ass off") and ROFL or ROTFL ("rolling on the floor laughing").

The list of acronyms "grows by the month" (said Peter Hershock in 2003), and they are collected along with emoticons and smileys into folk dictionaries that are circulated informally amongst users of Usenet, IRC, and other forms of (textual) computer-mediated communication. These initialisms are controversial, and several authors recommend against their use, either in general or in specific contexts such as business communications.

The Oxford English Dictionary first listed LOL in March 2011.

Origins
In the 1980s, Wayne Pearson was reportedly the first person to have used LOL while responding to a friend's joke in a pre-Internet digital chat room called Viewline. Instead of writing "hahaha," as he had done before when he found something humorous, Pearson instead typed "LOL" to symbolize extreme laughter.

Analysis
Silvio Laccetti (professor of humanities at Stevens Institute of Technology) and Scott Molski, in their essay entitled The Lost Art of Writing, are critical of the terms, predicting reduced chances of employment for students who use such slang, stating that, "Unfortunately for these students, their bosses will not be 'lol' when they read a report that lacks proper punctuation and grammar, has numerous misspellings, various made-up words, and silly acronyms." Fondiller and Nerone in their style manual assert that "professional or business communication should never be careless or poorly constructed" whether one is writing an electronic mail message or an article for publication, and warn against the use of smileys and abbreviations, stating that they are "no more than e-mail slang and have no place in business communication".

Linguist John McWhorter stated, "Lol is being used in a particular way. It's a marker of empathy. It's a marker of accommodation. We linguists call things like that pragmatic particles…" Pragmatic particles are the words and phrases utilized to alleviate the awkward areas in casual conversation, such as oh in "Oh, I don’t know" and uh when someone is thinking of something to say. McWhorter stated that lol is utilized less as a reaction to something that is hilarious, but rather as a way to lighten the conversation.

Frank Yunker and Stephen Barry, in a study of online courses and how they can be improved through podcasting, have found that these slang terms, and emoticons as well, are "often misunderstood" by students and are "difficult to decipher" unless their meanings are explained in advance. They single out the example of "ROFL" as not obviously being the abbreviation of "rolling on the floor laughing" (emphasis added). Matt Haig singles out LOL as one of the three most popular initialisms in Internet slang, alongside BFN ("bye for now") and IMHO ("in my honest/humble opinion"). He describes the various initialisms of Internet slang as convenient, but warns that "as ever more obscure acronyms emerge they can also be rather confusing". Hossein Bidgoli likewise states that these initialisms "save keystrokes for the sender but [...] might make comprehension of the message more difficult for the receiver" and that "[s]lang may hold different meanings and lead to misunderstandings especially in international settings"; he advises that they be used "only when you are sure that the other person knows the meaning".

Tim Shortis observes that ROFL is a means of "annotating text with stage directions". Peter Hershock, in discussing these terms in the context of performative utterances, points out the difference between telling someone that one is laughing out loud and actually laughing out loud: "The latter response is a straightforward action. The former is a self-reflexive representation of an action: I not only do something but also show you that I am doing it. Or indeed, I may not actually laugh out loud but may use the locution 'LOL' to communicate my appreciation of your attempt at humor."

David Crystal notes that use of LOL is not necessarily genuine, just as the use of smiley faces or grins is not necessarily genuine, posing the rhetorical question "How many people are actually 'laughing out loud' when they send LOL?". Louis Franzini concurs, stating that there is as yet no research that has determined the percentage of people who are actually laughing out loud when they write LOL.

Victoria Clarke, in her analysis of telnet talkers, states that capitalization is important when people write LOL, and that "a user who types LOL may well be laughing louder than one who types lol", and opines that "these standard expressions of laughter are losing force through overuse". Michael Egan describes LOL, ROFL, and other initialisms as helpful so long as they are not overused. He recommends against their use in business correspondence because the recipient may not be aware of their meanings, and because in general neither they nor emoticons are in his view appropriate in such correspondence. June Hines Moore shares that view. So, too, does Sheryl Lindsell-Roberts, who gives the same advice of not using them in business correspondence, "or you won't be LOL".

Acceptance
On March 24, 2011, LOL, along with other acronyms, was formally recognized in an update of the Oxford English Dictionary. In their research, it was determined that the earliest recorded use of LOL as an initialism was for "little old lady" in the 1960s. They also discovered that the oldest written record of the use of LOL in the contemporary meaning of "Laughing Out Loud" was from a message typed by Wayne Pearson in the 1980s, from the archives of Usenet.

Gabriella Coleman references "lulz" extensively in her anthropological studies of Anonymous.

A 2003 study of college students by Naomi Baron found that the use of these initialisms in computer-mediated communication (CMC), specifically in instant messaging, was actually lower than she had expected. The students "used few abbreviations, acronyms, and emoticons". Out of 2,185 transmissions, there were 90 initialisms in total; 76 were occurrences of LOL.

LOL, ROFL, and other initialisms have crossed from computer-mediated communication to face-to-face communication. David Crystal—likening the introduction of LOL, ROFL, and others into spoken language in magnitude to the revolution of Johannes Gutenberg's invention of movable type in the 15th century—states that this is "a brand new variety of language evolving", invented by young people within five years, that "extend[s] the range of the language, the expressiveness [and] the richness of the language". However Geoffrey K. Pullum argues that even if interjections such as LOL and ROFL were to become very common in spoken English, their "total effect on language" would be "utterly trivial".

Variations on the theme

Variants

 lul: phonetic spelling of LOL. "LUL" is also commonly used in the gaming community, due to it being an emote on Twitch, which depicts game critic TotalBiscuit laughing.
 lolz: Occasionally used in place of LOL.
 lulz: Often used to denote laughter at someone who is the victim of a prank, or a reason for performing an action. Its use originated with Internet trolls. According to a New York Times article about Internet trolling, "lulz means the joy of disrupting another's emotional equilibrium." Can be used as a noun – e.g. "do it for the lulz.", shortened into "ftlulz" (to distinguish it from "ftl" – "for the loss"). See also LulzSec.
 LOLOLOL...: For added emphasis, LOL can be appended with any number of additional iterations of "OL". In cases such as these, the abbreviation is not to be read literally (i.e., "Laughing out loud out loud out loud out loud"), but is meant to suggest several LOLs in a row.
 OMEGALUL and LULW: variants of "LUL" used as a Twitch emote.
 trolololol or trollololol: A blend of troll and LOL iterated. Indicates that the prank or joke was made by internet trolls, or the user thinks the prank or joke qualifies as internet trolling. See also Mr. Trololo.

Derivations

 (to) LOL: Used as a verb ("to laugh out loud") and is meant to be conjugated in the appropriate tense. When the past tense is meant, it is written as "LOL(e)d" or "LOL'd".
 lolwut (sometimes "lulwut"): lol + wut, used to indicate bemused laughter, or confusion.
 lawl, lawlz, or lal: Pseudo-pronunciation of LOL. Saying "lawl" is sometimes meant in mockery of those who use the term LOL, and is not meant to express laughter.
 Lel or LEL is a "playful or ironic" variation of LOL. It is sometimes thought to be an initialism, standing for "laughing extremely loud" or "laughing extra loud", but this has been disputed.
 lolcat, an image macro of a cat

Related

 *G* or *g*: For "grins". Like "lulz" it is used in the initialism "J4G" ("just for grins").
 kek: A term for laughter that originated in online games, possibly either World of Warcraft or StarCraft, the latter in which Korean players would type "kekeke" as onomatopoeia for laughter. It later became associated with alt-right politics, in the form of a parody religion surrounding the character Pepe the Frog by analogy with the frog-headed ancient Egyptian god Kek.
 LMAO: For "laughing my ass off". Variants: LMBO ("Laughing my butt off"), LMFAO ("Laughing my fucking ass off").
 lqtm: For "Laughing quietly to myself".
 ROFL: For "rolling on the floor laughing". It is often combined with LMAO for added emphasis as ROFLMAO ("Rolling on the floor laughing my ass off") or ROFLMFAO (Rolling on the floor laughing my fucking ass off).
roflcopter: A portmanteau of ROFL and helicopter. A popular glitch in the Microsoft Sam text-to-speech engine enables the voice to make a sound akin to the rotation of rotor blades when 'SOI' is entered, and the phrase 'My ROFLcopter goes soi soi soi..." is often associated with the term as a result.
 PMSL: For "pissing myself laughing".

Commonly used equivalents in other languages 

In some languages with a non-Latin script, the abbreviation LOL itself is also often transliterated. See for example Arabic لول and Russian лол.

Pre-dating the Internet and phone texting by a century, the way to express laughter in morse code is "hi hi". The sound of this in morse ('di-di-di-dit di-dit, di-di-di-dit di-dit') is thought to represent chuckling.

Most of these variants are usually found in lowercase.

 555: the Thai variation of LOL. "5" in Thai is pronounced "ha", three of them being "hahaha".
 asg: Swedish abbreviation of the term , meaning intense laughter.
 g: Danish abbreviation of the word griner, which means "laughing" in Danish.
 ha3: Malaysian variation of LOL. ha3 means pronouncing ha three times, "hahaha".
 jajajá: in Spanish, the letter "j" is pronounced /x/.
 jejeje: in the Philippines is used to represent "hehehe". "j" in Filipino languages is pronounced as /h/, derived from the Spanish /x/. Its origins can be traced to SMS language. It is widely used in a Filipino youth subculture known as Jejemons.
 kkkk: in Somali and Ethiopian languages spoken in the Horn of Africa, iterations of the letter "k", usually ranging between 2 and 8 k's, are used as a variation of LOL. These iterations are also used by Shona, Ndebele and other Zimbabwean languages speakers, with the longer variant being "kikiki" (emulating a laughing sound).
 mdr: French version, from the initials of "mort de rire" which roughly translated means "died of laughter", although many French people also use LOL instead as it is the most widely used on the internet.
 mkm: in Afghanistan "mkm" (being an abbreviation of the phrase "ma khanda mikonom"). This is a Dari phrase that means "I am laughing".
 ptdr: French variant from  – literally meaning "broken with laughter"
 rs: in Brazil "rs" (being an abbreviation of "risos", the plural of "laugh") is often used in text based communications in situations where in English LOL would be used, repeating it ("rsrsrsrsrs") is often done to express longer laughter or laughing harder. Also popular is "kkk" (which can also be repeated indefinitely), due to the pronunciation of the letter k in Portuguese sounding similar to the ca in card, and therefore representing the laugh "cacacacaca" (also similar to the Hebrew version above).
 wkwkwk: in Indonesian, "wkwkwk" is often used to express laughter. A new variant, "Akwoakwoak" or "Awkwoakwoak" is often used beside the original version. Both the original and the new variant are derived from the sound of Donald Duck laughing, something like "Wakakaka".
 חחח/ההה: Hebrew version of LOL. The letter ח is pronounced [/x/ /x/] and ה is pronounced [/h/ /h/]. Putting them together (usually three or more in a row) makes the word khakhakha or hahaha (since vowels in Hebrew are generally not written), which is in many languages regarded as the sound of laughter.
 : Arabic script repetition of the "" character meaning "Hahahaha" or "Hehehehe". "" is equivalent to the letter "H". The equivalents of the "a" or "e" short vowels are Arabic diacritics and are optional to write.
'ㅋ', is a Korean Jamo consonant representing a "k" sound, and '' represents an "h" sound. Both "" and "" represent laughter which is not very loud. However, if a vowel symbol is written, louder laughter is implied:  "haha" , "hoho."
 : in Chinese. Although  ("big laugh") is used, a more widespread usage is "" (ha ha ha) or "" on internet forums. The phonetic rendering, "haha", is also common.
: in Japanese, the kanji for laugh, is used in the same way as lol.
  ("li'l", "leel") is a Ukrainian variant of LOL. Originally it was a parody for Mykola Azarov language, so called "azirivka", in which all "o"s are replaced with "i".

The word lol in other languages
 In Dutch, lol is a word (not an acronym) which, coincidentally, means "fun" ("lollig" means "funny").
 In Welsh, lol means "nonsense" or "ridiculous"  – e.g., if a person wanted to say "utter nonsense" in Welsh, they would say "lol wirion" or "rwtsh lol".

See also

 Internet meme
 Leet

References

Further reading
 
 —an early Usenet posting of a folk dictionary of abbreviations and emoticons, listing LOL and ROTFL
  
 Claim to first use.

External links

1990s slang
2000s slang
2010s slang
Acronyms
Internet memes introduced in the 1990s
Internet slang
Slang
Texting codes
Laughter